Greenwood is a city in and the county seat of Leflore County, Mississippi, United States, located at the eastern edge of the Mississippi Delta region, approximately 96 miles north of the state capital, Jackson,  and 130 miles south of the riverport of Memphis, Tennessee. It was a center of cotton planter culture in the 19th century.

The population was 15,205 at the 2010 census. It is the principal city of the Greenwood Micropolitan Statistical Area. Greenwood developed at the confluence of the Tallahatchie and the Yalobusha rivers, which form the Yazoo River.

History

Native Americans
The flood plain of the Mississippi River has long been an area rich in vegetation and wildlife, fed by the Mississippi and its numerous tributaries. Long before Europeans migrated to America, the Choctaw and Chickasaw Indian nations settled in the Delta's bottomlands and throughout what is now central Mississippi. They were descended from indigenous peoples who had lived in the area for thousands of years. The Mississippian culture had built earthwork mounds in this area and throughout the Mississippi Valley, beginning about 950 CE. Their culture thrived for hundreds of years.

In the nineteenth century, the Five Civilized Tribes in the Southeast suffered increasing encroachment on their territory by European-American settlers from the United States. Under pressure from the United States government, in 1830 the Choctaw principal chief Greenwood LeFlore and other Choctaw leaders signed the Treaty of Dancing Rabbit Creek, ceding most of their remaining land to the United States in exchange for land in Indian Territory, what is now southeastern Oklahoma. The government opened the land for sale and settlement by European Americans. LeFlore came to regret his decision on land cession, saying in 1843 that he was "sorry to say that the benefits realized from [the treaty] by my people were by no means equal to what I had a right to expect, nor to what they were justly entitled."

European settlement
The first Euro-American settlement on the banks of the Yazoo River was a trading post founded in 1834 by Colonel Dr. John J. Dilliard and known as Dilliard's Landing. The settlement had competition from Greenwood Leflore's rival landing called Point Leflore, located three miles up the Yazoo River. The rivalry ended when Captain James Dilliard donated parcels in exchange for a commitment from the townsmen to maintain an all-weather turnpike to the hill section to the east, along with a stagecoach road to the more established settlements to the northwest.

The settlement was incorporated as "Greenwood" in 1844, named after Chief Greenwood LeFlore. The success of the city, founded during a strong international demand for cotton, was based on its strategic location in the heart of the Delta: on the easternmost point of the alluvial plain, and astride the Tallahatchie and Yazoo rivers. The city served as a shipping point for cotton to major markets in New Orleans, Vicksburg, Mississippi, Memphis, Tennessee, and St. Louis, Missouri.

The construction of railroads through the area in the 1880s revitalized the city; two rail lines ran to downtown Greenwood close to the Yazoo River, and shortened transportation to markets. Greenwood again emerged as a prime shipping point for cotton. Downtown's Front Street, bordering the Yazoo, was dominated by cotton factors and related businesses, earning that section the name "Cotton Row".

20th century
The city continued to prosper well into the 1940s. Cotton production suffered in Mississippi during the infestation of the boll weevil in the early 20th century; however, for many years the bridge over the Yazoo displayed the sign "World's Largest Inland Long Staple Cotton Market".

Cotton cultivation and processing became largely mechanized in the first half of the 20th century, displacing thousands of sharecroppers and tenant farmers. Since the late 20th century, some Mississippi farmers have begun to replace cotton with corn and soybeans as commodity crops; with the textile manufacturing industry having shifted overseas, farmers can gain stronger prices for the newer crops, used mostly as animal feed.

Greenwood's Grand Boulevard was once named one of America's 10 most beautiful streets by the U.S. Chambers of Commerce and the Garden Clubs of America. Sally Humphreys Gwin, a charter member of the Greenwood Garden Club, planted the 1,000 oak trees that line Grand Boulevard. In 1950, Gwin received a citation from the National Congress of the Daughters of the American Revolution in recognition of her work in the conservation of trees.

Geography
Greenwood is located at  (33.518719, -90.183883).

Climate

Demographics

2020 census

As of the 2020 United States Census, there were 14,490 people, 4,924 households, and 2,793 families residing in the city.

2010 census
At the 2010 census, there were 15,205 people and 6,022 households in the city. The population density was 1,237.7 per square mile (771.6/km). There were 6,759 housing units. The racial makeup of the city was 30.4% White, 67.0% Black, 0.1% Native American, 0.9% Asian, <0.1% Pacific Islander, <0.1% from other races, and 0.5% from two or more races. Hispanic or Latino of any race were 1.1% of the population.

Among the 6,022 households, 28.7% had children under the age of 18 living with them, 29.8% were married couples living together, 29.0% had a female householder with no husband present, 4.6% had a male householder with no wife present, and 36.6% were non-families. 32.5% of all households were made up of individuals living alone and 10.7% had someone living alone who was 65 years of age or older. The average household size was 2.48 and the average family size was 3.16.

Mississippi Blues Trail markers
Radio station WGRM on Howard Street was the location of B.B. King's first live broadcast in 1940. On Sunday nights, King performed live gospel music as part of a quartet. In memory of this event, the Mississippi Blues Trail has placed its third historic marker in this town at the site of the former radio station.
Another Mississippi Blues Trail marker is placed near the grave of the blues singer Robert Johnson. A third Blues Trail marker notes the Elks Lodge in the city, which was an important black organization. A fourth Blues Trail marker was dedicated to Hubert Sumlin that is located along the Yazoo River on River Road.

Gallery of Mississippi Blues Trail markers in Greenwood

Government and infrastructure

Local government 
Greenwood is governed under a city council form of government, composed of council members elected from seven single-member wards and headed by a mayor, who is elected at-large.

State and federal representation
The United States Postal Service operates two post offices in Greenwood: Greenwood and Leflore.

Media and publishing

Newspapers, magazines and journals
 The Greenwood Commonwealth

Television
 WABG-TV - ABC/Fox affiliate
 WMAO-TV - PBS affiliate

AM/FM radio
 WABG, 960 AM (blues)
 WGNG, 106.3 FM (hip-hop/urban contemporary)
 WGNL, 104.3 FM (urban adult contemporary/blues)
 WGRM, 1240 AM (gospel)
 WGRM-FM, 93.9 FM (gospel)
 WMAO-FM, 90.9 FM (NPR broadcasting)
 WKXG, 92.7 FM (Country music) KIX-92.7
 WYMX, 99.1 FM (classic rock)

Transportation

Railroads
Greenwood is served by two major rail lines. Amtrak, the national passenger rail system, provides service to Greenwood, connecting New Orleans to Chicago from Greenwood station.

Air transportation
Greenwood is served by Greenwood–Leflore Airport (GWO) to the east, and is located midway between Jackson, Mississippi, and Memphis, Tennessee. It is about halfway between Dallas, Texas, and Atlanta, Georgia.

Highways
 U.S. Route 82 runs through Greenwood on its way from Georgia's Atlantic coast (Brunswick, Georgia) to the White Sands of New Mexico (east of Las Cruces).
 U.S. Route 49 passes through Greenwood as it stretches between Piggott, Arkansas, south to Gulfport.
 Other Greenwood highways include Mississippi Highway 7.

Education
Greenwood Leflore Consolidated School District (GLCSD) operates public schools. Previously the majority of the city was in Greenwood Public School District while small portions were in the Leflore County School District. These two districts consolidated into GLCSD on July 1, 2019. Greenwood High School is the only public high school in Greenwood. As of 2014, the student body is 99% black. Amanda Elzy High School was formerly of the Leflore County district.  It was recently taken over by the State of Mississippi for poor performance as a result of deficient leadership.

Pillow Academy, a private school, is located in unincorporated Leflore County, near Greenwood.

Delta Streets Academy, a newly founded private school located in downtown Greenwood, has an enrollment of nearly 50 students. It has continued to increase enrollment.

St. Francis Catholic School, run by the Roman Catholic Diocese of Jackson, provides classes from kindergarten through sixth grade.

In addition, North New Summit School provides educational services for special-needs and at-risk children from kindergarten through high school.

In popular culture
Nightmare in Badham County (1976), Ode to Billy Joe (1976), and The Help (2011) were filmed in Greenwood. The 1991 movie Mississippi Masala was also set and filmed in Greenwood.

Notable people
 

 Valerie Brisco-Hooks, Olympic athlete
 Nora Jean Bruso, blues singer and songwriter
 Louis Coleman, Major League Baseball pitcher
 Byron De La Beckwith, white supremacist, assassin of civil rights leader Medgar Evers
 Carlos Emmons, professional football player 
 Betty Everett, R&B vocalist and pianist
 James L. Flanagan, electrical engineer and speech scientist
 Alphonso Ford, professional basketball player
 Webb Franklin, United States congressman
 Morgan Freeman, actor
 Jim Gallagher, Jr., professional golfer
 Bobbie Gentry, singer/songwriter
 Sherrod Gideon, professional football player
 Gerald Glass, professional basketball player
 Guitar Slim, blues musician
 Lusia Harris, basketball player
 Endesha Ida Mae Holland, American scholar, playwright, and civil rights activist
 Dave Hoskins, professional baseball player
 Kent Hull, professional football player
 Tom Hunley, ex-slave and the inspiration for the character "Hambone" in J. P. Alley's syndicated cartoon feature, Hambone's Meditations
 Robert Johnson, blues musician
 Jermaine Jones, soccer player for the New England Revolution and United States national team
 Cleo Lemon, Toronto Argonauts quarterback
 Walter "Furry" Lewis, blues musician
 Bernie Machen, president of the University of Florida
 Della Campbell MacLeod (ca. 1884 – ?), author and journalist
 Paul Maholm, baseball pitcher
 Matt Miller, baseball pitcher
 Mulgrew Miller, jazz pianist
 Carrie Nye, actress
 W. Allen Pepper Jr., US federal judge
 Fenton Robinson, blues singer/guitarist
 Laverne Smith, NFL player
 Tonea Stewart, actress
 Hubert Sumlin, blues guitarist
 Donna Tartt, novelist
 James K. Vardaman, Mississippi governor and senator
 Charlie Wells, hardboiled mystery writer, author of Let the Night Fall (1953) and The Last Kill (1955)
 Willye B. White, Olympic athlete

See also

References

External links
City of Greenwood

Cities in Mississippi
County seats in Mississippi
Cities in Greenwood, Mississippi micropolitan area
Cities in Leflore County, Mississippi
Mississippi Blues Trail
Populated places established in 1830
1830 establishments in Mississippi